

Events

Unknown date events
 Opening of Poldice Railway, Cornwall, England.
 Dr Richard Griffiths opens the "Doctor's Tramroad" connecting collieries with the Glamorganshire Canal system at Treforest in South Wales. This includes a three-arch viaduct which still survives.
 A prototype for the Leiper Railroad, a horse drawn quarry rail line, was built in Nether Providence Township, Delaware County, Pennsylvania during the summer.

May events
 May – Completion of main construction railway at site of Bell Rock Lighthouse off the coast of Scotland.

Births

February births 
 February 3 – Thomas Swann, president of Baltimore and Ohio Railroad 1847–1853, is born (d. 1883).

August births
 August 4 – Samuel Morton Peto, English railway contractor (d. 1889).

October births
 October 10 - Nathaniel Worsdell, English carriage builder (d. 1886).

Deaths

References